Claude Gensac (1 March 1927 – 27 December 2016) was a French actress. She appeared in more than 70 films and television productions since 1952. Gensac is the oldest nominee to date in the category César Award for Best Supporting Actress, nominated in 2015 for her role as Marthe in the film Lulu femme nue.

Career 
In 1952, Gensac portrayed the character of Evelyne in her first feature film, La Vie d'un homme honnête. She collaborated on a number of films with Louis de Funès, often playing his wife, to international acclaim. She appeared in the series of movies "Les Gendarmes" with Louis de Funès. She played De Funès' wife, Josepha Cruchot. After De Funès's death in 1983, Gensac was rarely involved in film, but was active as a theater actress. In 2001 she returned to film in the French version of Absolutely Fabulous, her first film role since 1983. Gensac appeared in over 100 cinema and television films, as well as numerous theater roles. In 2011 she was awarded the Ordre des Arts et des Lettres at the officer grade.

Personal life 
Claude Gensac was married twice: from 1952 to 1954 with the actor Pierre Mondy and from 1958 to 1977 with Henri Chemin, a racer and PR Manager of Ford France with whom she had a son. She died in her sleep on 27 December 2016. She was 89 years old.

Filmography

References

External links
 
 Les Archives du Spectacle
 Photos
 Homepage

1927 births
2016 deaths
People from Oise
French National Academy of Dramatic Arts alumni
Officiers of the Ordre des Arts et des Lettres
French film actresses
French television actresses
20th-century French actresses
21st-century French actresses